Joumana Marie Kidd is an actress and journalist and former wife of retired NBA basketball star Jason Kidd.

Early life and career
Born and raised in Foster City, California, she attended school obtaining a BS Degree in Communications from San Francisco State University until marrying Jason Kidd shortly after graduation and moving initially to Phoenix, Arizona then to Saddle River, New Jersey.

She initially was a stay-at-home mother to their newborn son T.J. (Trey Jason) but after a break into hosting for NBA television, decided to pursue a career in TV hosting, working briefly for the entertainment television show Extra, and went on to cover the Grammys and Rock 'n' Roll Hall of Fame ceremonies. In 2010, she was cast in the VH1 Reality Series Let's Talk About Pep.  She also appeared multiple times on Bethenny as a guest commentator, and had her own show on NET TV (Catholic Cable TV Network) called Women on Women (WOW).

Personal life
Jason and Joumana were married in 1997 and have three children Trey Jason (T.J.), and twins Miah and Jazelle.

In January 2001, Jason Kidd was arrested and pleaded guilty to a domestic abuse charge for assaulting his wife Joumana in anger.  As part of his plea, Kidd was ordered to attend anger management classes for six months.  Kidd completed the mandatory counseling and continued to attend on his own and it was reported that Kidd has since given up alcohol. He and his wife were both active in their church and were thought to have completely reconciled. On January 9, 2007, Jason Kidd filed for divorce against his wife, citing "extreme cruelty" during their relationship. Kidd contended intense jealousy, paranoia, and the threat of "false domestic abuse claims" to the police as reasons for the divorce. On February 15, 2007 Joumana Kidd filed a counterclaim for divorce, claiming that the NBA star—among countless instances of abuse—"broke her rib and damaged her hearing by smashing her head into the console of a car".

References

External links
 

Living people
American people of Lebanese descent
People from Foster City, California
Actresses from Phoenix, Arizona
People from Saddle River, New Jersey
American film actresses
American women journalists
San Francisco State University alumni
Journalists from California
21st-century American journalists
21st-century American women
Year of birth missing (living people)